Football Club de Rouen 1899 (commonly referred to as simply FC Rouen) is a French association football club based in Rouen, Normandy. The club was formed in 1899 and currently plays in Championnat National 2, the fourth level of French football. Rouen played its home matches at the Stade Robert Diochon; named after Robert Diochon, a historic player who was influential during the club's infancy. Rouen is known as Les Diables Rouges (The Red Devils) and have been since 1903.

Rouen's football division was founded in 1899, but the club itself was founded in 1896 as a rugby club. The club achieved professional status in 1933 and have spent 19 seasons in the first division of French football and 36 in the second division. Rouen's highest honour to date was winning the second division in 1936. In 1940 and 1945, the club won the league championship of France, however, due to the league being run during World War II and not under French Football Federation authority, the titles are unofficial. Rouen have also reached European level, competing in the 1969–70 edition of the Inter-Cities Fairs Cup, where the team was defeated by the eventual champions Arsenal 1–0 on aggregate in the third round.

In addition to Robert Diochon, Rouen have produced a host of players who contributed to the France national team during the team's early years. Edmond Delfour made 41 appearances with the national team from 1929–1938 and participated in three FIFA World Cups 1930, 1934 and 1938. He is one of five players to have appeared in all three of the pre-war World Cups. Delfour later went on to manage Rouen from 1940–1945 during the unofficial wartime championships. Jean Nicolas spent his entire career with Rouen and appeared in 25 matches, scoring 21 goals with the national team from 1933–1938. In the present day, Nicolas' goal output with the team ranks for tenth all-time and his average places him in a tie for third.

History 
Football Club de Rouen 1899 was founded under the name Football Club de Rouen in 1896 by an English merchant known by the surname Willing. The club was initially formed as a rugby club. Rouen spent three seasons primarily playing the sport of rugby before association football was introduced to the club in 1899. On 11 July 1899, the club officially announced the introduction of a football section. The section was primarily influenced by player Robert Diochon was, upon its creation, inserted into the regional league, Normandie Championnat, by the USFSA. In 1903, the club acquired the nickname Les Diables Rouges (The Red Devils). In 1910, Diochon was installed as president of the club. Under the reign of Diochon, Rouen won the Normandie Championnat in five straight seasons from 1909–1914. After World War I and the dissolving of the USFSA, Rouen began playing in the Normandie Division d'Honneur. From 1919–1933, the club won the league eight times and were led by mercurial striker Jean Nicolas. In 1925, Rouen reached the Coupe de France final. In the final, the club faced CASG Paris and were defeated 3–2 in the second leg of the final. The first leg had ended in a 1–1 draw, which constituted a second leg.

In July 1930, the National Council of the French Football Federation voted 128–20 in support of professionalism in French football. Rouen were among several clubs to adopt the new statute and, subsequently, became professional. The club was inserted into the second division and, as a result, became founding members of Division 2. In the league's inaugural season, Rouen finished 3rd. In the league's second season, the club finished as champions, thus earning promotion to Division 1. In Rouen's debut season in Division 1, the club surprisingly finished in 4th place. The club also reached the semi-finals of that year's Coupe de France. Rouen remained in Division 1 until the onset of World War II stopped the competition. After the war, professional football returned and Rouen were back in Division 1. The club spent only two seasons in the league before falling to Division 2 after finishing dead last in the 1946–47 season. Rouen spent the next 13 seasons playing in the second division. In 1953, Diochon died and the presidency was handed over to Auguste Duchêne. Under Duchêne, Rouen returned to Division 1 in 1960 and finished in 4th place in the club's first season back. Rouen remained consistent in the table for the next two seasons before falling down to the bottom half of the table in 1963. After finishing in the bottom half for five straight seasons, Rouen were forced into relegation by the French Football Federation after the club gave up its professional status due to financial and administrative issues.

Aside from a three-year stint in Division 1 from 1982–1985, Rouen have not maintain a consistent place in the first division since giving up its professional status. From 1970–1994, the club spent most of its life playing in Division 2. In 1995, the club filed for bankruptcy and subsequently changed its name to Grand FC Rouen. As a result of its bankruptcy filing, the club was administratively relegated to the Championnat National, the third level of football. In 1997, Rouen were relegated to the Championnat de France amateur and, in the next season, were playing in the fifth division. In 1999, Rouen, as an amateur club, reached the quarter-finals of the Coupe de France.

In July 2000, the club's new incoming president René Bertin changed the club's name to its current form. The club underwent a rebirth and, after three seasons, were back playing in the National division. In the 2002–03 season, Rouen finished 3rd in National and, as a result, earned promotion back to Division 2, now called Ligue 2. The club's return as a professional outfit was short as Rouen spent a disastrous season in the league, ultimately finishing in dead last. An ensuing relegation from National occurred in the following season and Rouen were back in the fourth division. In 2008, the club endured serious financial issues, which led to the club being relegated to the Championnat de France amateur 2 by the DNCG. However, after successfully appealing to the organisation, Rouen were inserted back into the fourth division. The club, subsequently, finished first in its group and were promoted back to National.

In the 2012–13 season, Rouen placed 5th in Championnat National, but they were relegated to the sixth division, Division d'Honneur, due to severe financial trouble of their management company.

In April 2015, US Quevilly joined with FC Rouen to form US Quevilly-Rouen Métropole, taking the place of US Quevilly in the Championnat de France Amateur for the 2015–16 season. This was not a straight merger, as FC Rouen continued to exist as separate entity with its own teams, whilst the new joint entity incorporated the colours and crest of FC Rouen into its kits and crest.

In 2017, FC Rouen were promoted from the Division d'Honneur Normandy to play in Championnat National 3. In the 2017–18 season, Rouen ensured their survival in National 3 on the final day. The following season, in 2019, they won promotion to Championnat National 2.

Players

Squad

Notable players 
Below are the notable former players who have represented Rouen in league and international competition since the club's foundation in 1899. To appear in the section below, a player must have played in at least 80 official matches for the club.

For a complete list of Rouen players, see :Category:FC Rouen players

 Bernard Antoinette
 Demba Ba
 André Betta
 Michel Bensoussan
 Jean-François Beltramini
 Jens Jørn Bertelsen
 Maurice Blondel
 Jean-Luc Buisine
 Jacques Canthelou
 Alfred Dambach
 Edmond Delfour
 Jean-Pierre Destrumelle
 Robert Diochon
 Daniel Druda
 Christian Gourcuff
 Christophe Horlaville
 Albert Lemaître
 Mohamed Lekkak
 Claude Le Roy
 William Louiron
 Dado Pršo
 André Mathieu
 Bora Milutinović
 Jean Nicolas
 Didier Notheaux
 Jean-Pierre Orts
 Michel Payen
 Pierre Phelipon
 Roger Rio
 Philippe Troussier
 Jorge Trezeguet
 Þórólfur Beck

Management and coaching

Club officials 
Football Club de Rouen 1899
President: Fabrice Tardy
Vice-President: Stéphane Leroux

Coaching and medical staff
Manager: David Fouquet
Assistant manager: Raynald Bertin
Goalkeeping coach: Alexandre Lerond
Intendant: Ali Mathlouti

Managerial history

Honours 
 Division 1: 1945 (unofficial)
 Division 2: 1936
 Championnat de France amateur: 2009 (Group D)
 Coupe de France runners-up: 1925
 Coupe de la Ligue runners-up: 1964
 Division d'Honneur (Normandy): 1922, 1924, 1927, 1930, 1931, 1932, 1933
 USFSA Normandy League: 1910, 1911, 1912, 1913, 1914

References

External links 

  Official website
  Culs Rouges Supporters Trust

 
1899 establishments in France
Rouen
Sport in Rouen
Football clubs in France
Football clubs in Normandy
Ligue 1 clubs